C5orf24 (chromosome 5 open reading frame 24) is a protein encoded by the C5orf24 gene (5q31.1) in humans. C5orf24 is primarily localized to the nucleus and is highly conserved with orthologs in mammals, birds, reptiles, amphibians, and fish.

Gene 
Human C5orf24 is a protein-coding gene 26,133 base pairs long (chr5:134,833,603-134,859,735) composed of two exons and one intron at locus 5q31.1 oriented on the plus strand. Alternate names for the gene are FLJ37562 and LOC134553. Genes neighboring C5orf24 include DDX46, RPL34P13, and TXNDC15. Some transcription factors predicted to bind to conserved sites on the promoter region (GXP_7545710) are NRF1, E2F, ZF5, and AHR.

Transcripts

The human C5orf24 gene has three mRNA transcript variants. Both transcript variant 1 and 2 encode protein isoform 1 which is 188 amino acids in length.  Transcript variant 1 is the longest and highest quality transcript (5083 nucleotides) with transcript variant 2 (4896 nucleotides) having a smaller 5' UTR region. Transcript variant 3 lacks an internal segment resulting in an alternate translational stop codon making it is the shortest variant (3054 nucleotides) encoding the smaller protein isoform 2 which is 155 amino acids in length.

Protein 

Isoform 1 of the UPF0461 protein C5orf24 is 188 amino acids long encoded by exon 2. It contains two disordered regions at the amino acid positions 1-20 and 79-142, respectively. The second disordered region contains a series of internal repeats. The human precursor protein is predicted to be 20.1 kDa with an isoelectric point of approximately 10. Immunoblotting demonstrated the experimental molecular-weight to be about 25 kDa. Three experimental phosphorylation sites have been reported at Ser37, Ser121, and Ser180 along with  evidence for a ubiquitination site at Lys146. A conserved nuclear localization signal at amino acid positions 79 – 83 (KKKK) was corroborated by immunofluorescence experiments using anti-C5orf24 antibodies depicting localization to the nucleoplasm. Affinity chromatography and anti tag coimmunoprecipitation experiments showed C5orf24 likely interacts with multiple other proteins including STK11, CAB39, LYK5, PKNOX1, and PBX1.

Evolutionary history

Orthologs 
The C5orf24 protein is not present in plants or fungus but orthologs have been found in mammals, birds, reptiles, amphibians, as well as bony fish (Osteichthyes) and cartilaginous fish (Chondrichthyes). There is evidence for an orthologous domain in jawless fishes (Agnatha) and invertebrates. Comparison of m values (corrected rate of divergence) between C5orf24 (NP_001129058.1), Cytochrome c (NP_061820.1) which has a slow rate of evolution, and Fibrinogen alpha (NP_000499.1) which has a fast rate of evolution demonstrated this protein evolved at fairly slow rate especially when fish sequences are excluded.

Paralogs 
The C5orf24 gene has no paralogs.

Conservation 
Multiple sequence alignments revealed the C5orf24 protein has been highly conserved and likely originated in cartilaginous fishes nearly 465 million years ago. A series of internal repeats in the second disordered region were additionally identified in proteins found within jawless fishes and invertebrates, suggesting an orthologous domain began even further back in evolutionary history.

Clinical significance

Expression 
C5orf24 is ubiquitously expressed with limited tissue variability. Microarray-assessed tissue expression patterns show C5orf24 levels decreasing in pro-inflammatory environments such as in patients with tibial muscular dystrophy and children with obesity.

Genotype-phenotype correlations
While this gene has yet to be well understood by the scientific community, some genotype-phenotype correlations have been established including the upregulation of C5orf24 in individuals with PTSD and downregulation in those with improved symptoms, a linear correlation between methylation levels of C5orf24 GC sites to negative affect scores in drug addicts, as well as GWAS studies demonstrating SNPs in C5orf24 to be associated with Parkinson's disease in the Chinese Han population and Crohn's disease.

References 

Animal proteins